The Nobel Prize in Chemistry is awarded annually by the Royal Swedish Academy of Sciences to scientists who have made outstanding contributions in chemistry. It is one of the five Nobel Prizes which were established by the will of Alfred Nobel in 1895.

Every year, the Royal Swedish Academy of Sciences sends out forms, which amount to a personal and exclusive invitation, to about three thousand selected individuals to invite them to submit nominations. The names of the nominees are never publicly announced, and neither are they told that they have been considered for the Prize. Nomination records are strictly sealed for fifty years. Currently, the nominations for the years 1901 to 1970 are publicly available. Despite the annual sending of invitations, the prize was not awarded in eight years (1916, 1917, 1919, 1924, 1933, 1940–42) and have been delayed for a year nine times (1914, 1918, 1920, 1921, 1925, 1927, 1938, 1943, 1944).

From 1901 to 1970, there have been 637 scientists nominated for the prize, 79 of which were awarded either jointly or individually. 16 more scientists from these nominees were awarded after 1970 and Frederick Sanger was awarded second time on 1980. Of only 15 women nominees, three were awarded. The first woman to be nominated was Marie Skłodowska Curie. She was nominated on 1911 by Swedish scientist Svante Arrhenius and French mathematician Gaston Darboux and eventually won the prize on the same year. She is the only woman to win twice the Nobel Prize: Physics (1903) and Chemistry (1911). Besides 27 and 13 scientists from these nominees won the prizes in Physiology or Medicine and in Physics (including one woman more) correspondingly (including years after 1970). Only one company has been nominated, the Geigy SA for the year 1947.

Despite the long list of nominated noteworthy chemists, physicists and engineers, there have been still some other great scientists who were overlooked for the prize in chemistry such as Per Teodor Cleve, Jannik Petersen Bjerrum, Ellen Swallow Richards, Alice Ball, Vladimir Palladin, Sergey Reformatsky, Prafulla Chandra Ray, Alexey Favorsky, Rosalind Franklin and Joseph Edward Mayer.

Nominees by their first nomination

1901–1909

1910–1919

1920–1929

1930–1939

1940–1949

1950–1959

1960–1969

1970–1972 
Nominees are published 50 years later so 1971 nominees should be published in 2022.

See also 

 List of Nobel laureates in Chemistry
 List of female nominees for the Nobel Prize
 List of nominees for the Nobel Prize in Physics
 List of nominees for the Nobel Prize in Literature

References 

+
Lists of scientists
Chemists